Pavel Tkáč (born 15 June 1998) is a Czech footballer who currently plays as a defender for Slovácko.

Career statistics

Club

Notes

References

1998 births
Living people
Czech footballers
Czech Republic youth international footballers
Association football defenders
1. FC Slovácko players
MFK Vítkovice players
Czech First League players
Czech National Football League players